Claude Elliott may refer to:
 Claude Elliott (baseball) (1876–1923), baseball player for the Cincinnati Reds and the New York Giants
 Claude Elliott (schoolmaster) (1888–1973), headmaster and later Provost of Eton College in the United Kingdom

See also
Claud Elliott Provincial Park, a provincial park in British Columbia, Canada